The Weizhangzi–Tashan railway is a single-track railway line in China.

The current level of service is one train in each direction per day.

Connections
Western terminus: Jinzhou–Chengde railway
Eastern terminus at Huludao: Shenyang–Shanhaiguan railway

References

Railway lines in China